Saurita tipulina is a moth in the subfamily Arctiinae. It was described by Jacob Hübner in 1812. It is found in Guatemala, Panama and Brazil (Santa Catarina, Espírito Santo, Pará).

References

Moths described in 1812
Saurita